Hats Off (1936) is an American film directed by Boris Petroff, and originally released by Grand National Pictures. The film is now in the public domain.

Plot summary
A pair of Texas towns are trying to outdo one another in planning a huge fair. While one community has Jimmy Maxwell arranging the entertainment, the other brings in Jo Allen, who uses a ruse to learn about Jimmy's plans, pretending to be a school teacher named Judy while her friend Mr. Churchill passes himself off as "Joe" Allen.

After learning that Jimmy's decided on a prizefight to draw the crowds, Jo counters by contacting a New York City showman, Caesar Rosero, and attempting to coax him into bringing his entire popular troupe to Texas to perform. By the time Jo regrets fooling Jimmy and begins to develop feelings for him, Jimmy angrily takes counter measures of his own, with Rosero getting caught in between.

Cast
Mae Clarke as Jo Allen
John Payne as Jimmy Maxwell
Helen Lynd as Ginger Connolly
Luis Alberni as Rosero
Richard "Skeets" Gallagher as Buzz Morton
Franklin Pangborn as Churchill
Robert Middlemass as Tex Connelly
George Irving as J.D. Murdock
Clarence Wilson as C.D. Pottingham

Soundtrack
 "Hats Off" (Music by Ben Oakland, lyrics by Herb Magidson)
 "Where Have You Been All My Life?" (Music by Ben Oakland, lyrics by Herb Magidson)
 "Twinkle, Twinkle Little Star" (Music by Ben Oakland, lyrics by Herb Magidson)
 "Little Odd Rhythm" (Music by Ben Oakland, lyrics by Herb Magidson)
 "Let's Have Another" (Music by Ben Oakland, lyrics by Herb Magidson)
 "Zilch's Hats" (Music by Ben Oakland, lyrics by Herb Magidson)

References

External links

1936 films
1936 musical comedy films
1936 romantic comedy films
American musical comedy films
American romantic comedy films
American romantic musical films
American black-and-white films
Grand National Films films
1930s romantic musical films
1930s English-language films
1930s American films